The Brazilian Federal Highway Police (Polícia Rodoviária Federal or PRF) is a federal highway patrol, subordinate to the Ministry of Justice, whose main function is fighting crime on Brazilian federal roads and highways, as well as monitoring and supervising vehicular traffic, although it has also taken on duties that go beyond its original authority, such as action within Brazilian cities and forests in conjunction with other public safety agencies.

It was subordinate to the old National Department of Roadways (Departamento Nacional de Estradas de Rodagem or DNER), now the National Department of Transport Infrastructure (Departamento Nacional de Infra-Estrutura de Transportes or DNIT), until the publication of Law 8,028 of 12 April 1990, which redefined the structure of the Brazilian executive branch.

Its competences are defined by article 144 of the Federal Constitution and by Law 9,503 (Brazilian Traffic Code), by Decree 1655 of 3 October 1995 and by its internal regulation, approved by Ministerial Decree 1,375 of 2 August 2007.

The title patrolman given to the members was abolished in 1998, replaced by the title policewoman/-man.  Members of the PRF are divided into four classes: Third, Second, First and Special.

Since 2009, entry into the PRF has required a university education degree recognized by the Ministry of Education. Condition now described in Law 9,654.

Organization 

The Federal Highway Police was created in 1928 during the administration of President Washington Luís, under the name Roadway Police (Polícia das Estradas).

It is present in all units of the federation and is managed by the Federal Highway Police Department (PRF), headquartered in Brasília. The states are divided into administrative units known as regions. A region can be a "superintendency", in the case of larger states, or a "district" in smaller states. Some regions encompass more than one Brazilian state.  Regions are divided into "delegations", which coordinate the patrol posts.

Currently the PRF has over four hundred patrol posts in the most diverse Brazilian municipalities, providing a capillarity to the structure of the agency that few national institutions possess.

Despite the uniformed work, the PRF is not a military institution and a rigid hierarchy among the police officers does not exist. The entire hierarchy is based on the functions of supervision, which can be occupied by any police officer, for example a special agent may be supervisor of an inspector.

The PRF, like other law enforcement agencies, also possesses specialized centers, such as the Special Operations Center (Núcleo de Operações Especiais or NOE), where its members receive regular training in more specialized forms of combat.

Activities

Alert System 

The PRF has one of the most innovative systems to combat vehicular theft.

After reporting a theft, the vehicle's owner, stuck in the bureaucratic system, must wait 24 hours in most cases for the report to be entered into the vehicular theft system.  Sometimes this information takes over 24 hours to enter the Integrated Traffic System.  Therefore, if the thief were to be stopped before this point, there would be no record of a stolen vehicle and the thief would not be prosecuted.

To eliminate this deficiency, the Federal Highway Police Department created the Alert System, where the owner can report a stolen vehicle via the Internet.  The theft victim enters his or her vehicle's license plate number and all PRF patrol posts will be immediately notified.

The system is still not well known, as it has had little coverage by the press, but it has proved to be an efficient instrument in fighting against vehicular theft, by those who use the internet.  The ability to interact with the PRF becomes instantaneous and free of bureaucracy, therefore optimizing the speed of information during the most critical moments.

As a theft report is linked to a Police Incident Report, the objective of the system is to have a record of the theft information during the most critical first 48 hours to aid in the easier recovery of the stolen vehicle, the system remains active for that license plate for 72 hours, requiring that, after 72 hours, the theft report be acted upon through the vehicular theft system of the traffic system, as the report at a delegation of the Civil Police has already concluded and will already be entered into the database.

This Alert System was created by PRF members with informatics degrees, who formed a programs development center to facilitate and improve the interactivity between police officers and vehicle owners.

Statistics 

The Federal Highway Police Department makes available a statistical survey updated daily. The press, as well as the public, can access the registry of apprehension of drugs and recovery of stolen vehicles.

Through this system, checking the information available on one day and comparing it to what is published on the next day, any user can find out the PRF's actions during the last 24 hours.

Traffic accident bulletin 

The traffic accident bulletin of the PRF was another interactive innovation implemented through a system known as BAT (boletim de acidente de trânsito), where the department makes available accident reports in any state of Brazil. Originally, it was known as BrBrasil.

Any federal highway police officer has access to an accident reported in this system, even if it was in another region.

This system allows accidents of national relevance to be investigated by the General Command in Brasília in real time.  The information is not only instantaneous for commanders, but also for any PRF officer who would like to consult this information.  Most importantly, it eases the person reporting the accident, who may be involved in public commotion and desires non-bureaucratic information, who can easily obtain this information upon request at a PRF patrol post.

The information in the PRF's data network not only circulates freely among regions and agents, but are also instantaneous.

Now, not only PRF officers can view and print the BATs, but also vehicle owners, insurance companies, drivers, and victims.  Anyone involved in the accident can print the bulletin, free of charge, directly from the PRF's website.

Armament 
Glock 17
PT 100 AF pistol and PT 940 pistol
SMT sub-machine gun
12 gauge shotgun
Para-Fal rifle
Colt M16 A-2 
IMBEL IA2 rifle
Armalite M15 

The Federal Highway Police was a pioneer among Brazilian law enforcement agencies in the use of .40 caliber S&W. This important step in the permission of a caliber with excellent stopping power came about due to the large number of PRF officers participating in marksmanship for sport, where the caliber was already used among the most experienced shooters.

The PRF presented sufficient argument to the Brazilian Army for that caliber to be allowed for PRF use.  Formerly using .380 ACP and .38spl for revolvers, the Brazilian Army did not offer any resistance to the improvement of the service conditions of that law enforcement class, as 38 caliber and .380 ACP presented less stopping power compared to .40 S&W. As the number of police personnel on federal highways is small, PRF officers sought to outmatch criminal assailants in the event of a confrontation. 

What could be considered a privilege, at the time, for federal highway police officers, the only police officers authorized to use .40 caliber S&W, eventually was extended slowly and gradually to other military and civilian police agencies all over the country. The .38 caliber revolvers, somewhat less powerful and less capacious, were retired by the Federal Highway Police.

Anti-crime operations

As the road is the main method of transport for merchandise, valuables, and people in Brazil, the PRF specializes in innumerable anti-crime activities, many times specific to the peculiarities of the region.  In border regions, emphasis is given to fighting against contraband and drug trafficking (with the aid of police dogs); the North Region is characterized by repression of environmental crimes, such as the extraction and transport of natural resources prohibited by law; and in the Northeast Region the PRF concentrates on fighting against marijuana trafficking and trafficking of minors.

All over the country, the PRF carries out searches for fugitives and criminals wanted who may be traveling on federal highways, recovery of stolen vehicles, as well as specific operations against the robbery of vehicles with valuable cargo and passenger buses.

Following their crime fighting vocation, the PRF now not only restricts itself to crimes on federal highways.  Recently a series of operations - some of which were carried out in conjunction with other federal agencies - reinforce the new position of the agency, acting ostensibly as a federal police force: Operação Carta Branca (against fraud in the issuing of licenses), Operação Paracelso (against the fuel mafia), Operação Seringueira, Operação Velozes e Furiosos, etc.  Hundreds of search and arrest warrants were carried out all over the country.

Emergency aid services 
The Federal Highway Police possesses, in some states, an agreement with the Mobile Emergency Assistance Service (Serviço de Atendimento Móvel de Urgência or SAMU) and makes available some vehicles and aircraft to aid accident victims.  Police officers trained in emergency services work in collaboration with doctors and nurses.

In other states, the PRF has an agreement with the Corpo de Bombeiros (firefighters) and provides aid services in conjunction with them.

Traffic patrol 
.
The PRF has the exclusive function of applying the Brazilian Traffic Code (Law 9,503 of 1997) on federal highways.  Traffic patrol is carried out in a simple and conventional manner by way of infraction notification forms and in more complex ways, using specialized equipment, such as speed radar, breathalyzers, and other measuring equipment such as scales.  After the time periods mandated by law, the notifications generate punishments, in most cases in the form of fines.

The main objective of traffic patrol is the prevention of accidents and the preservation of national heritage.

Recently, by the Law 11,705 of 2008, the PRF remains in charge of supervising commercial establishments along rural federal roads with the objective of restricting the sale of alcoholic beverages, in order to reduce the number of accidents occurring as a result of excessive consumption.

During the 2016 Summer Olympics, the PRF provide security and escort for the Olympic athletes during the cycling and cross-country track & field events of the Games.

Airborne operations 
The Federal Highway Police Department has for some time possessed the Airborne Operations Division (Divisão de Operações Aéreas or DOA), responsible for the airborne supervision of highways and aiding accident victims.

This division has bases in João Pessoa, Brasília, São Paulo, Pernambuco, Paraná, and Santa Catarina.  Each base works with a helicopter, with the Pernambuco base also having an airplane, used for the identification of marijuana plantations.  Currently the helicopters are used mostly for the aid of accident victims, as some bases have already made agreements with the SAMU.

Every helicopter is staffed by a pilot, an operator and a first responder, all of which are PRF officers.  At bases having agreements with the SAMU, the first responder is replaced by a doctor and a nurse.

The PRF's pilot and operator training course is considered one of the best among Brazilian law enforcement agencies.  In addition to technical knowledge, the officers perform exhaustive rescue training in diverse situations, including on the high seas.

The operators receive combat training and licenses to operate XM-15 rifles, used by the division, in order to also act as tactical support for crime fighting operations.

Land vehicles

In popular media
The PRF appear in Fast Five, the fifth movie of the Fast and the Furious series, where many of them are corrupt and in the payroll of drug lord Hernan Reyes, being sent to try and retrieve his vault full of his drug money after it was stolen from the PMERJ station alongside the PMERJ and Rio Civil Police. However, thanks to Dominic Toretto and his team, all of their pursuing cruisers are destroyed, their corrupt officers slaughtered, and Reyes himself executed by DSS Agent Luke Hobbs in revenge for murdering his team back in the favelas. Their main vehicles used in the film are the Volkswagen Jetta and the Ford Explorer. 

The TV series O Vigilante Rodoviário (The Road Ranger) was about a patrolman and his dog, who patrolled the highways of Brazil in a 1952 Harley-Davidson motorcycle or a Simca Chambord sedan depending on the assignment; the show has become a part of Brazilian culture owing to it being the first action adventure drama shot on film, and also popularizing the PRF.

Controversies 
Amidst the second round of the Brazilian runoff election, the PRF made several vehicle approaches in northeast Brazil, region with particularly high number of left-wing voters. At least 619 buses had been stopped by 17:00, voting closing time, a number 108% higher than the approaches made on the first round, four weeks before. It was alleged that this action was an attempt to retain citizens from getting to their voting locations, in support of current right-wing president Jair Bolsonaro. The chief director Silvinei Vasques headed to Superior Electoral Court (STE) to testify on behalf of his administrative decisions. According to the current president of the STE and minister of the Supreme Federal Court (STF), Alexandre de Morais, "There was no damage to the exercise of the right to vote and logically there will be no postponement of the end of voting time". The approaches caused a big controversy in social media, aggravated by the high political polarization in Brazil.

See also 
 Federal Police of Brazil
 Military Police (Brazil)
 Law enforcement in Brazil
 Civil Police (Brazil)
 National Public Security Force

References

External links
 Brazilian Highway Police Official Page (Portuguese)
 Military Police of Rio de Janeiro State, Brazil  (Portuguese)
 Civil Police of Rio de Janeiro State, Brazil (Portuguese)
 https://www.youtube.com/watch?v=yv3LOGMDbXs  Police Academy - 2012

Federal law enforcement agencies of Brazil
Government agencies established in 1928
1928 establishments in Brazil